This is a complete list of Philippine presidents who served by currency appearances, that consists of the heads of state in the history of the Philippines.

Sources
 pangulo.ph

Currency Appearances, List of Philippine Presidents by